Chakuli pitha is a flat Odia rice-based fermented cake traditionally popular in the regions of Odisha  in India. It is prepared and served during festivals.

Preparation 
The dish is prepared using rice flour, black gram, refined edible oil (preferably ghee or mustard oil), and salt. 

Rice flour, black gram are mixed with warm water and salt to create the batter. The batter is covered and left to ferment for several hours. The batter is then poured on a skillet to create round flat cakes. 
 

Chakuli pitha can be served on its own or paired with side dishes including guguni, sambhar, sugar, jaggery, tea, milk, vegetables, and mutton.

Variation
There are multiple variations of chakuli pitha. Saru Chakuli (ସରୁ ଚକୁଳି) is a thinner variation similar to dosa. Burha Chakuli (ବୁଢ଼ା ଚକୁଳି) is a thicker variation made mixed with jaggery, paneer and grated coconut.

See also
 Odia cuisine
 Dosa

References

Odia cuisine